John Sims (13 October 1749 – 26 February 1831) was an English physician and botanist. He was born in Canterbury, Kent and was subsequently educated at the Quaker school in Burford, Oxfordshire, he then went on to study medicine at Edinburgh University. Later in life he moved to London (1766) where he worked as a physician, notably he was involved with the birth of Princess Charlotte in which both mother and baby died. He was the first editor of Curtis's Botanical Magazine.

Early life
Sims was born in Canterbury, Kent, the son of, Robert Courthope Sims (1720–1812), a physician, and Rebecca née Tritton (1723–c1781). His father was a member of the Society of Friends who published An Essay on the Nature and Constitution of Man .

He was educated at the Quaker school in Burford, Oxfordshire, with additional instruction from his father. He studied medicine at Edinburgh University, obtaining his PhD in 1774. His dissertation was "De usu aquæ frigidæ interno."

Career

Medicine
He moved to London in 1766, where he worked as a physician at the Surrey Dispensary. He bought an obstetric practice in 1779, and was he was admitted to the Royal College of Physicians. In 1780 he was appointed Physician and Man Midwife to the Charity for Delivering Poor Married Women at their own Houses. In 1817 he was called to the ill-fated childbirth of Princess Charlotte at which mother and baby died.

Botany
He was the first editor of Curtis's Botanical Magazine (1801–1826 vols. xiv–xlii) after the death of the founder, William Curtis, and edited Annals of Botany (1805–06) with Charles Konig. He was a founding member of the Linnean Society. In March 1814 he was elected a Fellow of the Royal Society.

His papers on botany include a description of the effect of moisture on Mesembryanthemum to the Medical and Physical Journal (vol. ii. 1799), and a "Description of Amomum exscapum" to the Annals of Botany (vol. i.).

The genus  name Simsia was published by the German Christiaan Hendrik Persoon in 1807, to honour Sims work. 
His herbarium was purchased by George Bentham and passed to the Royal Botanic Gardens, Kew.

Death
In 1825 he resigned from his medical practice and retired to Dorking, Surrey where he died in 1831. He is buried in Fittleworth, Sussex with his wife Ann née Christie (1765–1835) and their only son the Rev Dr Courthope Sims MD MB (1795–1833).

References

External links
 
 

1749 births
1831 deaths
People from Canterbury
18th-century British botanists
18th-century English medical doctors
English taxonomists
Fellows of the Royal Society
English Quakers
Alumni of the University of Edinburgh
19th-century English medical doctors
Physicians of the Surrey Dispensary
19th-century British botanists